"Burnin' Up" is a song by American singer Faith Evans featuring rapper Loon. It was composed by Evans, Loon, Chad Hugo and Pharrell Williams for her third studio album Faithfully (2001), with production helmed by Hugo and Williams under their production moniker The Neptunes. A dance-inducing, beat-heavy uptempo song, "Burnin' Up" falls in line with the straightforward drums, guitar strumming, and clavichord worship of the duo's early years as producers. Lyrically, it has Evans pleading with a man she feels is destined to be her soulmate to recognize that they belong together.

The song was released to positive reviews from music critics who ranked among the album's standout tracks. "Burnin Up'" was released as the third single from Faithfully in March 2002, with rapper Missy Elliott replacing Loon on the single version. Another remix version of the song, re-titled "Just Burnin'" and produced by Just Blaze, featured vocals from P. Diddy and Freeway. Elliott, Diddy and Freeway all appeared alongside Evans in the music video for "Burnin Up'" which was filmed in a club on Hollywood and Vine. It became the last single from the album to chart on the Billboard Hot 100.

Critical reception
Shaheem Reid from MTV News felt that Evans was "on fire with passion on 'Burnin' Up.' Singing over the Neptunes' vintage dance-inducing string plucks and drum thumps, Faith pleads with a man she feels is destined to be her soulmate to recognize that they belong together [...] Bad Boy MC Loon uses his conversational flow to drop lines that teeter on the line between conceit and confidence. BBC Music's Keysha Davis found that "Burnin' Up" was "probably the main contender for crossover appeal. Produced by the Neptunes, the latest hit making collective with the Midas touch, this track has all the hallmarks of their previous chart toppers – continuous guitar strumming, plenty beats per minute and a ridiculously repetitive chorus. Allmusic ranked the song among their favorite tracks on Faithfully alongside "Alone in this World", “Back to Love” and “Can't Believe.”

Track listings

Credits and personnel 
Credits adapted from the liner notes of Faithfully.

Chris Athens – mastering
Andrew Coleman – recording
Faith Evans – writer, vocals
Serban Ghenea – Mixing

Chad Hugo – producer, writer
Chauncey "Loon" Hawkins – writer, vocals
Meelah Williams – backing vocals
Pharrell Williams – producer, writer

Charts

Weekly charts

Year-end charts

References

2002 singles
Faith Evans songs
Missy Elliott songs
Songs written by Missy Elliott
Song recordings produced by the Neptunes
Songs written by Chad Hugo
Songs written by Pharrell Williams
2001 songs
Bad Boy Records singles
Songs written by Faith Evans
Songs written by Loon (rapper)